The cosman's Murex (Chicoreus cosmani) is a species of sea snail, a marine gastropod mollusk in the family Muricidae, the murex snails or rock snails.

Description

Distribution

References

Chicoreus
Gastropods described in 1979
Taxa named by Robert Tucker Abbott